Shoot Boxing World Tournament 2010 or S-Cup 2010 was a shoot boxing event promoted by Caesar Takeshi. It was the seven bi-annual (70kg/154lbs weight class) Shoot Boxing World Tournament, featuring an eight-man single elimination format, with one reserve fight, all fought under Shoot Boxing Rules. The eight finalists and two reserve fighters were a mixture of invitees or had been involved in previous events (for more detail on this see the bulleted list below).  As well as tournament matches there were also two 'Opening Fights', a 'Women's Fight' and three 'Super Fights' all fought under Shoot Boxing Rules (various weight classes).  In total there were twenty-two fighters at the event, representing six countries.

The tournament winner was Buakaw Por. Pramuk who defeated Toby Imada in the final by second round technical knockout.  Both fighters were shoot boxing debutants, with Buakaw entering as the result of a dispute with K-1 and Imada a MMA fighter who was a late substitute for Charles "Krazy Horse" Bennett who was unable to attend due to legal issues which prevented him from leaving the United States.  Although Buakaw won the event it was Imada who had the biggest effect on the tournament, defeating three time S-Cup champion Andy Souwer in the semi finals in what was the biggest upset ever experienced in the sport.  The event was held at the JCB Hall in Tokyo, Japan on Tuesday, November 23, 2010.

S-Cup 2010 Finalists
 Toby Imada - Invitee, Bellator Fighter (MMA), late replacement for Charles Bennett who was unable to participate due to legal issues
 Henry van Opstal - Invitee, W.M.C. European Super Welterweight Champion
 Buakaw Por. Pramuk - Invitee, 2004, 2006 K-1 World MAX Champion
 Rhyse Saliba - Invitee, W.M.C. Australian Super Welterweight Champion
 Hiroki Shishido - S-Cup 2004 Runner-up
 Andy Souwer - S-Cup 2008, S-Cup 2004 and S-Cup 2002 Champion
 Bovy Sor Udomsorn - Invitee
 Takaaki Umeno - Invitee, Shoot Boxing Japanese Super Welterweight Champion

S-Cup 2010 Reservists
 Kenji Kanai - Invitee, S-Cup 2008 Quarter Finalist
 Jun Hyuk Song - Invitee

Bracket

Results

See also
List of male kickboxers

References

Shoot boxing events
2010 in kickboxing
Kickboxing in Japan
Sports competitions in Tokyo